The 2006 Saint Francis Red Flash football team represented Saint Francis University as a member of the Northeast Conference (NEC) during the 2006 NCAA Division I FCS football season. The Red Flash were led by fifth-year head coach Dave Opfar and played their home games at the newly-constructed DeGol Field, which was in its first year as the home of the Red Flash. They finished the season 3–8 overall and 2–5 in NEC play to place fourth.

Schedule

References

Saint Francis
Saint Francis Red Flash football seasons
Saint Francis Red Flash football